George Lawson Milne (April 19, 1850 – March 13, 1933) was a Scottish-born physician and political figure in British Columbia. He represented Victoria City in the Legislative Assembly of British Columbia from 1890 to 1894.

Biography
He was born in Garmouth, Morayshire, came to Canada in 1857 and was educated in Meaford, Ontario and at the Toronto School of Medicine. In 1882, he married Nellie Kinsman. Milne served as Health Officer and as a school trustee for Victoria. He also was federal medical inspector and immigration agent at Victoria and a justice of the peace. He ran unsuccessfully for a seat in the assembly in an 1889 by-election. In 1896, Milne was an unsuccessful candidate for a seat in the Canadian House of Commons. He died in Victoria at the age of 82.

References

External links
 

1850 births
1933 deaths
Independent MLAs in British Columbia
British emigrants to Canada